Parveen Kaur may refer to:

 Parveen Kaur (Canadian actress) (born 1988)
 Parveen Kaur (Indian actress)